María Beatriz Zavala Peniche (born October 23, 1957, in Mérida, Yucatán) is a Mexican politician affiliated with the National Action Party  who has served in the lower and upper house of the Mexican Congress.  In 2006 Felipe Calderón designated her as Secretary of Social Development.

Personal life and education
Zavala, born in Mérida, Yucatán, holds a bachelor's degree in anthropology from the Autonomous University of Yucatán (UADY) and studies towards a master degree in sociology from the University of Kentucky. She has been a professor of the UADY.

Political career
Zavala is an active member of the PAN since 1995. From 1997 to 2000 she served in the Chamber of Deputies of Mexico during the LVII Legislature; from 2001 to 2003 she served as local deputy in the Congress of Yucatán; then from 2003 to 2006 she served again in the Chamber of Deputies this time during the LIX Legislature.   In 2006 she won a seat in the Senate of Mexico representing Yucatán but left that position to join Felipe Calderón's presidential cabinet as Secretary of Social Development. In January 2008 she left the cabinet and returned to the senate.

References

1957 births
Living people
Politicians from Yucatán (state)
People from Mérida, Yucatán
National Action Party (Mexico) politicians
Members of the Chamber of Deputies (Mexico)
Members of the Senate of the Republic (Mexico)
Mexican people of Basque descent
Women members of the Senate of the Republic (Mexico)
Members of the Congress of Yucatán
21st-century Mexican politicians
21st-century Mexican women politicians
Women members of the Chamber of Deputies (Mexico)
Universidad Autónoma de Yucatán alumni
Academic staff of Universidad Autónoma de Yucatán
University of Kentucky alumni